The 2001–02 Irish Cup was the 122nd edition of Northern Ireland's premier football knock-out cup competition. It concluded on 11 May 2002 with the final.

Glentoran were the defending champions, winning their second successive Irish Cup last season after a 1–0 win over archrivals Linfield in the 2001 final. This season Linfield went one better, to lift the cup for the 36th time overall and the first time in seven years, with a 2–1 win over Portadown in the final. This was Portadown's second defeat in the final in three years.

Fifth round

|}

Replays

|}

Sixth round

|}

Replays

|}

Quarter-finals

|}

Replay

|}

Semi-finals

|}

Final

References

2001-02
2001–02 domestic association football cups
Cup